Rob Doyle may refer to:
 Rob Doyle (ice hockey)
 Rob Doyle (writer)